Naomi Bishop (born 19 August 1967) is a female former diver who competed for Great Britain and England. Bishop represented Great Britain at the 1988 Summer Olympics and the 1992 Summer Olympics.

She also represented England in the 1 metre and 3 metres springboard events, at the 1990 Commonwealth Games in Auckland, New Zealand and was a member of the Oldham Diving Club.

References

Living people
1967 births
English female divers
Divers at the 1990 Commonwealth Games
Olympic divers of Great Britain
Divers at the 1988 Summer Olympics
Divers at the 1992 Summer Olympics
Commonwealth Games competitors for England